= Field cycling =

Measurement method

Field cycling is a measurement method which uses variable magnetic fields to measure the magnetization of a sample. Fast field cycling is the same method except with fast switchable magnetic fields.

Field cycling is either "mechanical" or "electrical." Mechanical field cycling moves the sample between two positions with different (static) magnetic fields and can be done using static magnetic fields. Electrical field cycling requires switchable fields. The sample remains at its original position during both forms of field cycling.

Field cycling is used in fast field cycling relaxometry to measure specific physical and chemical properties of materials. For instance, nuclear magnetic resonance frequencies depend on the molecular environment. Furthermore, nuclear spin-lattice relaxation rates depend on local molecular mobility.

== See also ==
- NMR spectroscopy
